Amanda "Mandy" Valentine (born July 25, 1990, in Ottawa, Ontario) is a Canadian figure skater. She was also a regular judge on the television series Ghost Trackers, and had a 2010 acting role in the Canadian television series Mixed Blessings.

Background
Mandy Valentine is the daughter of the Canadian born, former NHL player ( Washington Capitals ) ( Chris Valentine )and mother, ( Barbara Valentine ) a former dancer/choreographer with both CFL ( BC Lions  and Ottawa Roughriders )NFL (  LA Rams ) cheerleading organizations.  While the family moved to Germany for father's professional hockey career ( Duesseldorf EG )her mother was Entertainment Director and Choreographer for NFL Europe League (Duesseldorf, Rhein Fire).  Mandy has a younger brother, Curt Valentine who played amateur hockey in both Germany and Canada.

Mandy began figure skating at the age of four in Düsseldorf, Germany, where her father was playing professional ice hockey. While skating competitively in Germany Mandy won two National titles - German Novice and German Junior Figure Skating Championships.  Upon her father's retirement from professional hockey the family returned to Canada where Mandy continued to compete at an elite level for Canada.  Her Canadian figure skating titles include Canadian Novice Champion and Canadian Junior Silver Medalist.  In International competitions she was Bronze Medalist at Junior North American Challenge and won the Gold Medal representing Canada at an international competition in Slovenia.  
In 2007 Mandy, her brother Curtis and mother Barbara moved to Vancouver where Mandy continued to train at BC Center of Excellence (Burnaby) until a severe knee injury ended her competitive figure skating career.

Mandy 
She won the national and international junior competitions for the Nepean Figure Skating Club. She has also trained at the BC Centre of Excellence in Burnaby, British Columbia.

References

1990 births
Canadian female single skaters
Living people
Sportspeople from Ottawa